Roger Ibañez da Silva (born 23 November 1998) is a Brazilian professional footballer who plays for Serie A club Lazio and the Brazil national team. Mainly a central defender, he can also play as a defensive midfielder.

Club career

Early career 
Playing as a midfielder, he joined  later in that year, and made his senior debut during the 2016 Copa Serrana, which was the club's first professional competition.

On 5 December 2016, Ibañez signed for Sergipe on loan for the season. The following 4 March, however, after featuring rarely, he was recalled. Upon returning, he became a regular starter during PRS' Campeonato Gaúcho Série B campaign.

Fluminense 
In the middle of 2017, Ibañez joined Fluminense and was initially assigned to the under-20 squad. Promoted to the first team for the 2018 season by manager Abel Braga, he made his professional debut on 20 January 2018, starting in a 0–0 Campeonato Carioca home draw against Botafogo.

On 28 February 2018, Ibãnez had his federative rights purchased by Flu, and he signed a new five-year deal with the club. He made his Série A debut on 15 April, starting in a 2–1 away loss against Corinthians, and finished the campaign with 14 league appearances.

Atalanta 
On 29 January 2019, Ibañez signed with  Italian club Atalanta. Having been inserted in the squad in February, he received his debut on 11 May, coming on for the final few minutes of their 2–1 victory over Genoa. He replaced attacker Josip Iličić as the club was in the heat of battle for a top-four Serie A finish and UEFA Champions League qualification for the first time in their history, which they eventually achieved.

Ibañez made his first appearance the following season on the final day of Atalanta's group stage campaign in the Champions League. Needing a win away to Shakhtar Donetsk, Ibañez came on for centre-forward Luis Muriel for the final 20 minutes with Atalanta leading 1–0 and having previously abandoned their regular back three for a back four while in search of the winning goal. Ibañez had only been included in one of the previous five match day squads, but the suspension of Rafael Toloi and an injury to Simon Kjær paved the way for his inclusion. Atalanta would win the game 0–3, qualifying for the knockout stage.

Roma 
On 27 January 2020, Ibañez moved to Serie A club Roma and signed a four-and-a-half-year contract with the club. The transfer was initially a loan until 30 June 2021, set to convert to a permanent transfer for a predetermined fee of €8 million if certain conditions were met. On 4 March 2021, he signed a new long-term deal with Roma until 30 June 2025.

International career
On 9 September 2022, Ibañez received his first call up to the Brazil national team, for friendlies against Ghana and Tunisia. He made his debut against Tunisia on 27 September, in a 5–1 win.

Career statistics

Club 

 Notes

International

Honours 
Roma
 UEFA Europa Conference League: 2021–22

References

External links 

 Profile at the A.S. Roma website
 

1998 births
Living people
Sportspeople from Rio Grande do Sul
Brazilian people of Uruguayan descent
Sportspeople of Uruguayan descent
Brazilian footballers
Brazil international footballers
Association football defenders
Campeonato Brasileiro Série A players
Club Sportivo Sergipe players
Fluminense FC players
Serie A players
Atalanta B.C. players
A.S. Roma players
Brazilian expatriate footballers
Brazilian expatriate sportspeople in Italy
Expatriate footballers in Italy
UEFA Europa Conference League winning players